Nives is a given name, pronounced NEE-ves,  which may refer to:

Nives Celzijus (born 1981), Croatian socialite, model, singer and writer
Nives Ivanković (born 1967), Croatian actress
Nives Meroi (born 1961), Italian mountaineer
Nives Orešnik (born 1992), Slovenian model

See also
Neves (surname)